Ítalo Sartori (born 29 November 1919) was an Argentine rower. He competed in the men's coxed four event at the 1948 Summer Olympics.

References

External links
 

1919 births
Possibly living people
Argentine male rowers
Olympic rowers of Argentina
Rowers at the 1948 Summer Olympics
People from Mariano del Friuli
Sportspeople from Friuli-Venezia Giulia